Larry Donnell Nance Sr. (born February 12, 1959) is an American former professional basketball player. A forward from Clemson University, Nance played 13 seasons (1981–1994) in the National Basketball Association (NBA) as a member of the Phoenix Suns and Cleveland Cavaliers. He was a three-time NBA All-Star.

College career
Nance played for the Clemson Tigers, who made it to the Elite Eight in his junior year.

Professional career

Phoenix Suns (1981-1988)
Nance scored 15,687 career points and grabbed 7,067 career rebounds, but he is perhaps best known as the first winner of the NBA Slam Dunk Contest in 1984, earning him the nickname "The High-Ayatolla of Slamola". Nance was a model of consistency throughout his NBA career.  He averaged over 16 points and 8 rebounds per game for all eleven seasons as a starter.  His best scoring average year was in the 1986–1987 NBA season, where he averaged 22.5 points per game.  Always among the highest in field goal percentage, Nance was an excellent mid-range shooter as well as a talented inside player.

Nance was involved in a trade between the Suns and the Cavaliers in 1988. Nance's stint in Phoenix came to an end on February 25, 1988, when, with the Suns struggling to a 16–35 mark, he was traded with Mike Sanders and Detroit's No. 1 pick in 1988 (used to pick Randolph Keys) to Cleveland for Kevin Johnson, Mark West, Tyrone Corbin and Cleveland's first (used for Dan Majerle) and second round (used for Dean Garrett) picks in 1988 and the Lakers' second round pick in 1989 (used for Greg Grant).

Cleveland Cavaliers (1988-1994)
The trade worked out for both teams, as Nance proved to be the missing piece Cleveland needed to contend for a title in the East, while at the same time playing the role of frontcourt post partner to center Brad Daugherty before a series of back injuries forced Daugherty to retire. For the Suns, Johnson, Majerle and West became key players in the team's late 1980s and early 1990s success. Corbin, following a successful season in Phoenix, was selected by the Minnesota Timberwolves in the 1989 expansion draft.

Nance was a 3-time NBA All-Star 1985, 1989, and 1993, and an NBA All-Defensive Team First Team member in 1989, and a Second Team Member in 1992 and 1993.  He was also consistently one of the league's better shot blockers, averaging 2.2 blocks per game during his career.  Upon his retirement, he held the league record for most blocked shots by any player other than a center.

NBA career statistics

Regular season

|-
| style="text-align:left;"| 
| style="text-align:left;"| Phoenix
| 80 || 0 || 14.8 || .521 || .000 || .641 || 3.2 || 1.0 || .5 || .9 || 6.6
|-
| style="text-align:left;"| 
| style="text-align:left;"| Phoenix
| 82 || 82 || 35.5 || .550 || .333 || .672 || 8.7 || 2.4 || 1.2 || 2.6 || 16.7
|-
| style="text-align:left;"| 
| style="text-align:left;"| Phoenix
| 82 || 82 || 35.4 || .576 || .000 || .707 || 8.3 || 2.6 || 1.0 || 2.1 || 17.7
|-
| style="text-align:left;"| 
| style="text-align:left;"| Phoenix
| 61 || 55 || 36.1 || .587 || .500 || .709 || 8.8 || 2.6 || 1.4 || 1.7 || 19.9
|-
| style="text-align:left;"| 
| style="text-align:left;"| Phoenix
| 73 || 69 || 34.0 || .581 || .000 || .698 || 8.5 || 3.3 || 1.0 || 1.8 || 20.2
|-
| style="text-align:left;"| 
| style="text-align:left;"| Phoenix
| 69 || 67 || 37.2 || .551 || .200 || .773 || 8.7 || 3.4 || 1.2 || 2.1 || 22.5
|-
| style="text-align:left;"| 
| style="text-align:left;"| Phoenix
| 40 || 34 || 36.9 || .531 || .400 || .751 || 9.9 || 3.1 || 1.1 || 2.4 || 21.1
|-
| style="text-align:left;"| 
| style="text-align:left;"| Cleveland
| 27 || 26 || 33.6 || .526 || .000 || .830 || 7.9 || 3.1 || .7 || 2.3 || 16.2
|-
| style="text-align:left;"| 
| style="text-align:left;"| Cleveland
| 73 || 72 || 34.6 || .539 || .000 || .799 || 8.0 || 2.2 || .8 || 2.8 || 17.2
|-
| style="text-align:left;"| 
| style="text-align:left;"| Cleveland
| 62 || 53 || 33.3 || .511 || 1.000 || .778 || 8.3 || 2.6 || .9 || 2.0 || 16.3
|-
| style="text-align:left;"| 
| style="text-align:left;"| Cleveland
| 80 || 78 || 36.6 || .524 || .250 || .803 || 8.6 || 3.0 || .8 || 2.5 || 19.2
|-
| style="text-align:left;"| 
| style="text-align:left;"| Cleveland
| 81 || 81 || 35.6 || .539 || .000 || .822 || 8.3 || 2.9 || 1.0 || 3.0 || 17.0
|-
| style="text-align:left;"| 
| style="text-align:left;"| Cleveland
| 77 || 77 || 35.8 || .549 || .000 || .818 || 8.7 || 2.9 || .7 || 2.6 || 16.5
|-
| style="text-align:left;"| 
| style="text-align:left;"| Cleveland
| 33 || 19 || 27.5 || .487 || .000 || .753 || 6.9 || 1.5 || .8 || 1.7 || 11.2
|-
|- class="sortbottom"
| style="text-align:center;" colspan="2" | Career
| 920 || 795 || 33.4 || .546 || .145 || .755 || 8.0 || 2.6 || .9 || 2.2 || 17.1
|-class="sortbottom"
| align="center" colspan="2"| All-Star
| 3 || 0 || 14.7 || .714 || .000 || .750 || 4.7 || .7 || .7 || 1.3 || 11.0

Playoffs

|-
| style="text-align:left;"| 1982
| style="text-align:left;"| Phoenix
| 7 || 0 || 18.3 || .610 || .000 || .500 || 4.6 || 1.0 || 1.4 || 1.6 || 7.7
|-
| style="text-align:left;"| 1983
| style="text-align:left;"| Phoenix
| 3 || 0 || 34.3 || .400 || .000 || .800 || 8.3 || 1.0 || 1.0 || 2.0 || 12.0
|-
| style="text-align:left;"| 1984
| style="text-align:left;"| Phoenix
| 17 || 0 || 37.2 || .590 || .000 || .671 || 8.7 || 2.4 || .9 || 2.0 || 16.9
|-
| style="text-align:left;"| 1988
| style="text-align:left;"| Cleveland
| 5 || 5 || 40.0 || .531 || .000 || .889 || 7.2 || 3.6 || .4 || 2.2 || 16.8
|-
| style="text-align:left;"| 1989
| style="text-align:left;"| Cleveland
| 5 || 5 || 39.0 || .551 || .000 || .656 || 7.8 || 3.2 || .6 || 2.4 || 19.4
|-
| style="text-align:left;"| 1990
| style="text-align:left;"| Cleveland
| 5 || 5 || 31.8 || .578 || .000 || .750 || 4.8 || 2.4 || .6 || 2.0 || 12.2
|-
| style="text-align:left;"| 1992
| style="text-align:left;"| Cleveland
| 17 || 17 || 40.1 || .494 || .000 || .829 || 9.2 || 2.5 || .8 || 2.7 || 18.0
|-
| style="text-align:left;"| 1993
| style="text-align:left;"| Cleveland
| 9 || 9 || 36.6 || .565 || .000 || .767 || 8.2 || 2.3 || .9 || 1.6 || 16.1
|- class="sortbottom"
| style="text-align:center;" colspan="2" | Career
| 68 || 41 || 35.7 || .541 || .000 || .742 || 7.9 || 2.4 || .9 || 2.1 || 15.7

Personal life
Nance's son, Larry Nance Jr., played college basketball for Wyoming before being selected with the 27th overall pick in the 2015 NBA draft by the Los Angeles Lakers. He played two and a half seasons with the Lakers before being traded to the Cleveland Cavaliers in February 2018. Nance granted the Cavaliers permission to let his son wear his retired no. 22 jersey. Nance's daughter, Casey Nance, played college basketball for Dayton. Another son, Pete Nance, began playing for the Northwestern Wildcats during the 2018–19 season, and transferred to the University of North Carolina Tar Heels for the 2022-23 season.

Nance now owns a 1967 "Catch 22" Camaro NHRA drag racer, which his team races on weekends.

See also
List of National Basketball Association career blocks leaders
List of National Basketball Association single-game blocks leaders

References

External links
 www.larrynance22.com
 

1959 births
Living people
African-American basketball players
American men's basketball players
Basketball players from South Carolina
Centers (basketball)
Clemson Tigers men's basketball players
Cleveland Cavaliers players
National Basketball Association All-Stars
National Basketball Association players with retired numbers
People from Anderson, South Carolina
Phoenix Suns draft picks
Phoenix Suns players
Power forwards (basketball)
21st-century African-American people
20th-century African-American sportspeople